Mosqueda is a surname. Notable people with the surname include:

Juan Carlos Mosqueda (born 1985), Mexican football player
Kaleena Mosqueda-Lewis (born 1993), American basketball player
Sylvia Mosqueda (born 1966), American long distance runner 
Teresa Mosqueda, American politician and labor activist